Bao Nguyen is a Vietnamese-American documentary film director, cinematographer and producer. He is best known for his work on the documentary films Julian, Live from New York! and Be Water.

Life and career
Nguyen was born in Silver Spring, Maryland. His parents left Vietnam for the United States as refugees of the Vietnam War. He graduated his BA at New York University and his MFA at the School of Visual Arts. His work has aired on HBO, NBC, Vice, and PBS.

Filmography

Film

Documentary

Television

Awards and nominations

References

External links
 

American documentary film directors
American documentary film producers
American cinematographers

Living people

Year of birth missing (living people)